In Maryland v. King, 569 U.S. 435 (2013), the United States Supreme Court decided that a cheek swab of an arrestee's DNA is comparable to fingerprinting and therefore, a legal police booking procedure that is reasonable under the Fourth Amendment. 

The majority balanced state interests relating to detaining and charging arrestees against the affected individuals' interests in their bodily integrity and informational privacy. It concluded that it is constitutionally reasonable for the state to undertake the "negligible" physical intrusion of swabbing the inside of the legitimately detained arrestee's cheeks and using limited data from the DNA to determine whether the individual might be associated with a crime scene or victim.

Background and Procedural Posture 
Alonzo Jay King Jr. was arrested for first- and second-degree assault. The case was heard before the Supreme Court in February 2013, and a verdict was released four months later, in June 2013. As according to Maryland police protocol, the Maryland DNA Collection Act, a DNA sample was taken from King at the time of the arrest and entered into Maryland's database. It was matched to an unsolved rape case in 2003.

A Maryland officer presented the evidence to a Wicomico County grand jury, which called for an indictment, procured a warrant to obtain a second buccal DNA sample that could be used as incriminating evidence for the 2003 rape case.

King filed a motion to suppress the DNA evidence, stating that it infringed upon his Fourth Amendment rights, which prohibit unreasonable searches and seizures, in the Circuit Court for Wicomico County. His motion was denied, and King pleaded not guilty to the charge of rape and appealed the ruling. The Maryland Court of Appeals then reversed the original ruling, agreeing that the DNA sampling was a violation of the Fourth Amendment and could not be used as evidence.

The State of Maryland then appealed the ruling and called for the case to be reviewed by the Supreme Court of the United States.  Dr. Steven D. Schwinn's article titled "Fourth Amendment," published by the American Bar Association, best gives a full detailed progression of the case.

Decision and Dissenting Opinion 
The decision was close, 5-4 in favor of Maryland. The majority opinion, written by Justice Anthony Kennedy, described Maryland's law as follows:
The Act authorizes Maryland law enforcement authorities to collect DNA samples from "an individual who is charged with... a crime of violence or an attempt to commit a crime of violence; or... burglary or an attempt to commit burglary."

Maryland law defines a crime of violence to include murder, rape, first-degree assault, kidnaping, arson, sexual assault, and a variety of other serious crimes. Once taken, a DNA sample may not be processed or placed in a database before the individual is arraigned (unless the individual consents). It is then that a judicial officer ensures that there is probable cause to detain the arrestee on a qualifying serious offense.

If "all qualifying criminal charges are determined to be unsupported by probable cause... the DNA sample shall be immediately destroyed." DNA samples are also destroyed if "a criminal action begun against the individual... does not result in a conviction,... the conviction is finally reversed or vacated and no new trial is permitted "or "the individual is granted an unconditional pardon."
Justice Antonin Scalia, joined by Justices Ruth Bader Ginsburg, Sonia Sotomayor, and Elena Kagan, filed a scathing dissenting opinion. The justices maintained that "categorically" and "without exception," "The Fourth Amendment forbids searching a person for evidence of a crime when there is no basis for believing the person is guilty of the crime or is in possession of incriminating evidence." Some Supreme Court cases seem to contradict this position.

The dissent also warned that, "[a]s an entirely predictable consequence of today's decision, your DNA can be taken and entered into a national DNA database if you are ever arrested, rightly or wrongly, and for whatever reason."

Justice Scalia took the rare step of reading his dissent from the bench, "signaling deep disagreement" on the Court.

Genetic and Law Enforcement Technology 
Maryland's DNA database laws began in 1994 and continued to expand until 2002. All felonies and some misdemeanors would result in that the suspect DNA is entered into the State CODIS (Combined DNA Index System) database. The DNA is collected using a buccal swab, which is a brush inside of the cheek. The DNA from the cheek cells in the swab is replicated, is given a restriction enzyme digest, and is electrophoresed.

Electrophoresis separates DNA segments by their size, and different people have unique sizes of segments of DNA because of variations in the DNA sequence. The sequence modification allows governments, like Maryland's, to identify the alleles, versions of some loci or gene, of a person in the DNA. The collection of genetic markers allows for high precision identification of a suspected criminal from the DNA samples found at crime scenes or on victims.

The genetic markers from an individual are searched against all other felons and arrestees in the database when police are attempting to compile evidence by the use of blood, saliva, skin, or other bodily fluids.

Implications 
Maryland v. King presented competing issues regarding social ethics and the law. The case deals with the issue of consent, because King did not give consent to a cheek swab that led to his DNA being entered into the Maryland CODIS database. However, King did not find that to be an issue until after his arrest for a rape that took place nearly a decade earlier, predicated on the fact that his DNA matched DNA acquired from the original rape victim. Regardless of how the evidence was obtained, King was considered a danger to society because of his association with a prior violent crime.

King and his lawyers argued that even a rapist is still a rightful citizen of society, who deserves equal protection according to the Constitution.

The Fourth Amendment declares that no person shall be subject to an unreasonable search or seizure, which may be assumed to include DNA tests. Furthermore, after King was apprehended because his DNA was matched with a sample collected from a rape case, King's appeal meant that his DNA analysis was unlawful and could not be used as evidence. However, after a successful appeal from Maryland, the charge was reinstated.

The extent to which the case is a move toward replacing the rule that warrants must be based on probable cause, normally required with a general standard of reasonableness in Fourth Amendment jurisprudence, has been debated. Instead of obtaining a warrant or tying the DNA swabbing to an individualized suspicion, taking DNA soon after an arrest is justified based on reasonableness by weighing "the promotion of legitimate governmental interests" against "the degree to which [the search] intrudes upon an individual's privacy" (133 S.Ct. at 1970).

In later cases, the Court has continued to maintain that a warrant is required unless a well-defined categorical exception to the warrant requirement applies or the search is "special needs," "administrative" or "regulatory" one (such as random drug testing of student athletes) whose primary purpose is something other than the production of evidence for the investigation or prosecution of a crime. King thus remains one of only a handful of cases that stands outside this framework.

For the state of Maryland to be able to rightfully obtain and use the buccal sample from the defendant, King must first be arrested for a violent or serious crime. Then, an indictment for a court order would be placed to get a second DNA sample to use for the rape case. If he was not convicted, his DNA would have been destroyed.

A DNA sample offers more insight than a simple fingerprint, aiding the police and protecting the arrestee from being wrongly convicted. Additionally, the sample serves the   purpose of determining if the release of the arrestee poses a risk to the community, the victim, or the arrestee. At the conclusion of this case, the Supreme Court ruled in favor of Maryland in that there is no real difference between "the practice of how DNA samples are used, and fingerprints, other than the unparalleled accuracy DNA provides." The overall ruling is that it not a violation of the Fourth Amendment in that these samples are part of the protocol when a person is arrested for a serious or violent crime, and the DNA get placed in the system and not be removed except on request.

The future implication of the ruling set the future precedent of allowing policing bodies to obtain buccal DNA samples from arrested criminals. It can then be used to match convicts with other dangerous crimes, giving solace to families and protecting society.

Briefs 
In the eyes of the defendant, Alonzo Jay King Jr., there was no evidence to link him to any pre-existing crimes. By taking a buccal sample without informed consent is against the law in that it is an unwarranted analysis of his DNA sample, which is prohibited by the Fourth Amendment. DNA testing is not analogous to fingerprinting but an invasion of privacy that citizens have the "right to secure their persons, houses, papers, and effects." There cannot be exceptions for searches of parolees or a special needs exception, which does not require a warrant, because those arrested maintain reasonable expectations of privacy until conviction. Taking into account the balance of securities, the privacy interests outweigh the government's interests. The Maryland police officers did not follow due process and violated the right to privacy as guaranteed in the Bill of Rights.

As for the plaintiff, the Maryland DNA Collection Act serves as a well-established, legitimate booking procedure for all individuals indicted on charges of violence or burglary. The act and the Maryland state CODIS database were established to keep communities safe by improving the criminal justice system and police investigation practices. A buccal swab is a painless, non-invasive medical procedure and all genetic information is determined from the CODIS regions of the genetic sample, which are commonly used in DNA identification procedures. It is not a violation of the Fourth Amendment because no other genetic information other than the CODIS regions are collected. Individuals give consent for their genetic data to be entered into the state of Maryland's CODIS database and may request their data to be destroyed upon exoneration or dropped charges. The defendant did not request for his DNA to be removed from the system until his DNA matched with that of another crime that had been committed 10 years prior to the alleged assault.

Criticism 
There are many critics of this case in response to the decision. The dissenting view claims that the potential benefits of finding actual perpetrators of cold cases and the possibility of freeing those wrongly convicted do not outweigh the critical privacy concerns. On the other hand, those in favor of the ruling see this case as an important weapon in fighting future crimes.

References

Further reading

External links
 

2013 in United States case law
United States Supreme Court cases
United States Supreme Court cases of the Roberts Court
DNA
Medical lawsuits
United States Fourth Amendment case law